The Barking Learning Centre, in the London Borough of Barking and Dagenham, is a community-based learning facility. The centre is located in Barking Town Square and hosts a library, a cafe, an art gallery, a sauna and spa, and offers a range of courses and qualifications. It was constructed on the site of the much-lamented former Barking Library.  The Barking Learning Centre website states that its primary focus: "is to provide education and training opportunities linked to the public service areas of health, education, social care and administration, to support increased participation to learning locally".The Barking Learning Centre was officially opened on 10 June 2008 by John Denham, the then Secretary of State for Innovation, University and Skills.

Courses
Courses at the Barking Learning Centre include health, education, social care, and recreation. The courses are provided by Barking and Dagenham College, the Adult College of Barking and Dagenham, and the University of East London.

References

External links
 Barking College 
 The Adult College of Barking and Dagenham
 The University of East London
 Understanding People: Foundation Degree at the BLC

Education in the London Borough of Barking and Dagenham
Learning Centre
Adult education in the United Kingdom
Community centres in England
Further education colleges in London
Buildings and structures in the London Borough of Barking and Dagenham
Tourist attractions in the London Borough of Barking and Dagenham
Educational institutions established in 2008
2008 establishments in England